Adolfo Justino Lima Camejo (born July 24, 1990) is a Uruguayan footballer who plays for Defensor Sporting of Uruguay.

Lima has previously played for Juventud de Las Piedras, Cerro Largo and Unión San Felipe, where he was loaned out several times. He played for Al-Wehda in the Saudi Professional League between 2015 and 2017, before moving to Uruguayan club Liverpool on a free transfer in July 2017.

References

1990 births
Living people
People from Melo, Uruguay
Uruguayan footballers
Uruguayan expatriate footballers
Association football midfielders
Juventud de Las Piedras players
Cerro Largo F.C. players
Unión San Felipe footballers
Ñublense footballers
Club Atlético Patronato footballers
Al-Wehda Club (Mecca) players
Liverpool F.C. (Montevideo) players
Defensor Sporting players
Uruguayan Primera División players
Primera B de Chile players
Chilean Primera División players
Saudi Professional League players
Primera Nacional players
Expatriate footballers in Chile
Expatriate footballers in Argentina
Expatriate footballers in Saudi Arabia
Uruguayan expatriate sportspeople in Chile
Uruguayan expatriate sportspeople in Argentina
Uruguayan expatriate sportspeople in Saudi Arabia